The women's individual recurve archery event at the 2015 Summer Universiade was held at the International Archery Center in Gwangju, South Korea from 4 July to 8 July 2015. It was the fifth time the event had been contested at the Summer Universiade and was its first appearance since the 2011 Summer Universiade, archery having not been selected as part of the sporting programme for the 2013 edition. Open to athletes aged between 17 and 28 enrolled in an undergraduate or postgraduate university programme, a total of fifty-eight archers from twenty-nine countries entered the competition.

Ki Bo-bae of South Korea entered as the defending champion. Ki also entered as the reigning Olympic champion, with Mariana Avitia of Mexico, who won the bronze medal at the London 2012 Olympics, also competing.

In the ranking round Ki broke the world record score for a 72-arrow round which had been held by former Olympic champion Park Sung-hyun, also of South Korea, for more than ten years. Ki went on to successfully defend her Universiade title, defeating teammate Choi Mi-sun in a one-arrow shoot-off in the final to win the gold medal. Maja Jager of Denmark won the bronze medal after beating Hsiung Mei-chien of Chinese Taipei, also in a one-arrow shoot-off.

Format

The women's individual was an outdoor recurve target archery event held to the World Archery-approved rules. Archers shot at a 122 cm-wide target from a distance of 70 metres, with each arrow awarded between one and ten points depending on how close it landed to the centre of the target. The competition was spread over five days and consisted of an initial ranking round, six elimination rounds, and two finals matches, which decided the winners of the gold, silver, and bronze medals. In the ranking round, each of the 58 archers entering the competition shot a total of 72 arrows. The total score of each archer was used to seed the archers into the following single-elimination tournament, the number one seed going to the highest-scoring archer.

The elimination rounds used the Archery Olympic Round set system introduced in international competitions in 2010. Each match consisted of a maximum of five sets, with archers each shooting three arrows per set. The archer with the highest score from their three arrows, for a maximum of 30, won the set, earning two set points. The archer with the lowest score in each set received zero points. If the score was tied, each archer received one point. The first archer to reach six set points was declared the winner. If the match was tied at five set points each after the maximum five sets were played, a single tie-breaker arrow was used with the archer shooting closest to centre of the target winning.

Schedule

Report

The ranking round held on the morning of Saturday, 4 July was dominated by the three South Korean entries of Ki, Choi, and Kang Chae-young. Ki topped the standings with a new world record total for a 72-arrow round, scoring 686 to beat the existing record of Park Sung-hyun, set in 2004, by four points. It was not initially clear whether Ki's score would be officially recognised due to conflicting information about whether the Summer Universiade competition met World Archery standards for a new record to be set. The Gwangju Universiade Organising Committee later confirmed on the following Wednesday that Ki would indeed stand as the new world record holder.

The final between Ki and Choi was characterised by Chungnam Ilbo as a battle between the present and future stars of Korean archery. It was the second time the two had faced off against one another in an international final in 2015, having previously contested the gold medal at the second stage of the Archery World Cup in Antalya, Turkey, in which Choi emerged victorious.  In an even contest, neither Ki nor Choi shot lower than 28 in any of the five sets, Ki holding the advantage until Choi won the third and fourth sets to take a 5-3 lead in set points. A perfect score of 30 in the fifth set by Ki however tied the match, necessitating the day's second medal-deciding one-arrow shoot-off.

The victory marked Ki's first individual title for almost three years.

Results

Ranking round
Key
 Advanced to 1/16 elimination round 
 Advanced to 1/24 elimination round 
 Advanced to 1/48 elimination round

Elimination rounds

Finals

Note: An asterisk (*) denotes a win from a one-arrow shoot-off 
'''Source:

References

External links
Schedule and results

Summer Universiade
2015 in women's archery
2015 Summer Universiade events
International archery competitions hosted by South Korea